The 1996 Indian Federation Cup was the 21st season of the Indian Federation Cup. The tournament started on 29 June 1996 to 11 August. The competition was won by East Bengal, who defeated Dempo 2–1 in the final.

Round of 16

Quarter-finals

Semi-finals

Third-Place match

Final

References
 1996 Indian Federation Cup at Rec.Sport.Soccer Statistics Foundation
 19th "Kalyani Black Label" Federation Cup at indianfootball.de

Indian Federation Cup seasons
1996–97 domestic association football cups
1996–97 in Indian football